Coffee County is a county located in the central part of the state of Tennessee, in the United States. As of the 2020 census, the county's population was 57,889.  Its county seat is Manchester. Coffee County is part of the Tullahoma-Manchester, TN Micropolitan Statistical Area. It is also part of Middle Tennessee, one of the three Grand Divisions of the state.

History
Coffee County was formed in 1836 from parts of Bedford, Warren, and Franklin counties. It was named for John Coffee, a prominent planter, land speculator, and militia officer. Similar to other counties in this area of the state, planters here cultivated mostly tobacco and hemp, produced by the labor of Black slaves.

In the period after the Reconstruction era ended (1877) and into the early 20th century, whites in Coffee County committed eight lynchings of Blacks. This was the fifth-highest total of any county in the state, but three other counties also had eight lynchings each.

Century Farms
Coffee County has twelve Century Farms, the classification for farms that have been operating for more than 100 years. The oldest Century Farm is Shamrock Acres, founded in 1818. Other Century Farms include:

 Beckman Farm
 Brown Dairy Farm
 Carden Ranch
 Crouch-Ramsey Farm
 Freeze Farm
 The Homestead Farm
 Jacobs Farm
 Long Farm
 Shamrock Acres
 Sunrise View Farm
 Thomas Farm, site of the Farrar Distillery

Geography

Adjacent counties
Cannon County (north)
Warren County (northeast)
Grundy County (east)
Franklin County (south)
Moore County (southwest)
Bedford County (west)
Rutherford County (northwest)

Major highways
Interstate 24
U.S. Route 41
U.S. Route 41A

State protected areas
Arnold Engineering Development Complex Wildlife Management Area (jointly managed by TWRA and USAF)
Bark Camp Barrens Wildlife Management Area
Hickory Flats Wildlife Management Area
Maple Hill Wildlife Management Area
May Prairie State Natural Area
Normandy Wildlife Management Area (part)
Old Stone Fort State Archaeological Park
Short Springs State Natural Area

Demographics

2020 census

As of the 2020 United States census, there were 57,889 people, 21,646 households, and 14,777 families residing in the county.

2000 census
As of the census of 2000, there were 48,014 people, 18,885 households, and 13,597 families residing in the county.  The population density was 112 people per square mile (43/km2).  There were 20,746 housing units at an average density of 48 per square mile (19/km2).  The racial makeup of the county was 93.43% White, 3.59% Black or African American, 0.30% Native American, 0.74% Asian, 0.03% Pacific Islander, 0.91% from other races, and 1.00% from two or more races.  2.19% of the population were Hispanic or Latino of any race.

There were 18,885 households, out of which 32.40% had children under the age of 18 living with them, 56.90% were married couples living together, 11.10% had a female householder with no husband present, and 28.00% were non-families. 24.30% of all households were made up of individuals, and 10.30% had someone living alone who was 65 years of age or older.  The average household size was 2.50 and the average family size was 2.96.

In the county, the population was spread out, with 25.10% under the age of 18, 8.30% from 18 to 24, 28.40% from 25 to 44, 23.60% from 45 to 64, and 14.60% who were 65 years of age or older.  The median age was 38 years. For every 100 females, there were 95.10 males.  For every 100 females age 18 and over, there were 92.30 males.

The median income for a household in the county was $34,898, and the median income for a family was $40,228. Males had a median income of $32,732 versus $21,014 for females. The per capita income for the county was $18,137.  About 10.90% of families and 14.30% of the population were below the poverty line, including 17.80% of those under age 18 and 15.20% of those age 65 or over.

Events
The Bonnaroo Music Festival has been held annually in the county since 2002.

Notable people
Henry Choate, worked in Coffee County at the time of his murder in 1927
Dustin Lynch, country singer.
Bryan Morris, baseball player.
 DJ Qualls, film actor.
 Betty Sain, horse trainer and breeder.
J. Stanley Rogers, Tennessee House of Representatives majority leader.
Ally Walker, actress.

Points of interest

Arnold Engineering Development Complex
George Dickel Tennessee whiskey distillery
Old Stone Fort — part of Old Stone Fort State Archaeological Park, just west of Manchester
Short Springs State Natural Area
Farrar Distillery – on the U.S. National Register of Historic Places

Communities

Cities

 Manchester (county seat)
 Tullahoma

Census-designated places
 Hillsboro
 Lakewood Park
 New Union

Unincorporated communities
 Beechgrove
 Belmont
 Blanton's Chapel
 Farrar Hill
 Fredonia
 Fudgearound
 Noah
 Pocahontas
 Shady Grove
 Summitville

Politics
Coffee County is a Republican stronghold. The last Democrat to carry this county was Bill Clinton in 1996.

See also
National Register of Historic Places listings in Coffee County, Tennessee
The Saturday Independent

References

External links

 Official site
 Industrial Board of Coffee County
 Coffee County Schools
 Coffee County, TNGenWeb – genealogy resources 
Bonnaroo Music Festival site

 
1836 establishments in Tennessee
Populated places established in 1836
Tullahoma, Tennessee micropolitan area
Middle Tennessee
Counties of Appalachia